Tomb KV36, located in the Valley of the Kings in Egypt, was used for the burial of the noble Maiherpri from the Eighteenth Dynasty.

Rediscovered by Victor Loret in his second season in the Valley of the Kings, on 30 March 1899, the tomb was found to be substantially undisturbed, but as it has for a long time not been properly published, it is not as well known as other burials in the valley.  All the objects found were taken to the Egyptian Museum in Cairo where they were published in the Catalogue General (short: CG). The only source for the arrangement of the objects in the burial chamber was a short article by Georg Schweinfurth. He visited the tomb briefly before its contents were brought to Cairo. However, recently the notebooks of Loret were found and published, providing a detailed list and description of the objects found and their arrangement in the tomb chamber.

The tomb of Maiherpri is a small shaft tomb with a chamber at the bottom on its west side. The burial chamber was undecorated, as with all burial chambers of non-royals in the Valley of the Kings. It is 3.90 m long and 4.10 m wide.Not much is known about Maiherpri as he does not appear in sources outside the tomb. Only two titles appear on the objects within the burial: child of the nursery and fan-bearer on the right side of the king. Examination of the mummy showed that he was a young man when he died.

Maiherpri was placed in a set of three coffins. The outer one is rectangular, painted black with gilded inscriptions and gilded decoration. It is more a shrine than a coffin. Inside it there were two anthropoid coffins also in black with gilded decoration. There is a third anthropoid coffin found next to this coffin ensemble with its lid placed next to the box. This caused some confusion and discussion in Egyptology. It seems that the 'extra' coffin was intended as the innermost one, but was actually too big to fit into the set and was therefore left unused next to it. A similar situation was found in the burial of Tutankhamun, where his second coffin was also slightly too large for the outermost one.  There the coffin was shortened directly in the tomb chamber, while in the burial of Maiherpri a new coffin was obtained.

The Maiherpri mummy was adorned with a mummy mask. At the foot end of the rectangular coffin, on the east side was found his canopic box with the four canopic jars in it. Next to it was the Book of the Dead of Maiherpri and several boxes with mummified pieces of meat. At the head of the coffins many pottery vessels were found. Other objects from this tomb are 

stone vases, a senet game, a nicely painted faience bowl, a quiver, a glass vase and a funerary bed with the shape of Osiris laid out in wheat.

References

Literature 
 Christian Orsenigo: La tomba di Maiherperi (KV 36). In: La Valle dei Re Riscoperta, I giornali di scavo Vitor Loret (1898-1899) e altri inediti. Mailand 2004, pp. 214–221, 271–281 (with English translation by Stephen Quirke)
 Reeves, N & Wilkinson, R.H. The Complete Valley of the Kings, 1996, Thames and Hudson, London.
 Siliotti, A. Guide to the Valley of the Kings and to the Theban Necropolises and Temples, 1996, A.A. Gaddis, Cairo.

External links 
 Theban Mapping Project: KV36 includes detailed maps of most of the tombs.

1899 archaeological discoveries
Buildings and structures completed in the 14th century BC
Valley of the Kings